Khalia Gol (also Romanized as Khālīā Gol and Khālīāgol; also known as Khālīkul) is a village in Divshal Rural District, in the Central District of Langarud County, Gilan Province, Iran. At the 2006 census, its population was 29, in 10 families.

References 

Populated places in Langarud County